Bethany School is a private boarding and day school for girls and boys aged 11–18 (Year 7-11 and Sixth Form), in Goudhurst, Kent, United Kingdom, founded by a Baptist minister and still places great emphasis on its Christian character.

Headmaster Francie Healy has been in post since September 2010. Bethany School was founded by The Reverend Joseph Kendon in 1866.

Sports and other extracurricular activities 

Bethany has a wide variety of sports. Rugby, football, and cricket are among the most popular sports for boys, with netball, hockey, and rounders for girls. The school also has extensive other sporting facilities, including fitness premises, and a 25-metre, six-lane indoor swimming pool.

A wide variety of clubs and activities are available to pupils and these are incorporated within the school day.  These range from Arts & Crafts to beekeeping, model making, equestrian, archery, table tennis, chef school and many more.

The Duke of Edinburgh's Award scheme is extremely popular with pupils from Year 10 upwards and each year between 15-20 pupils achieve the Gold Award.

Business Studies pupils have the option in the Sixth Form of participating in Young Enterprise, a charity scheme where pupils form a business and attempt to generate profits for shareholders.

Recent development 

In recent years, Bethany School has seen a major development of new buildings, such as a dedicated Sixth Form Centre.

The orchard was completed in 1999 and provides a separate living area for Sixth Form pupils with ensuite study bedrooms.  In 2001 a modern sports complex was completed, providing a new 'weights room' and a climbing wall.

A new library was completed in 2002 and the former library was converted into a drama studio. 
The Holmes Building which houses Business Studies and Geography was completed in 2003.

In September 2005 the completely reconstructed and redesigned dining hall complex was completed.

The modern Food & Nutrition rooms were opened in 2006, as well as new language classrooms.  A new Astroturf was constructed in 2007.

In 2009 a new £5 million Science block was built, after the previous one burnt down. 2013 saw extensive refurbishment within the boarding accommodation.

In 2021 Funding for a new performing arts center started. £825,000 funding was met in June 2022. September 2022 Construction started.

Community 

Bethany has historically put a strong emphasis on community, and continues to do so; extracurricular activities are wide and numerous.

Boarding Houses

The Mount 
The Mount is for boys from Years 7 to 12, who like to refer to themselves as Mounties, and has recently been refurbished with brand new, bespoke furnishings. The Mount is a boys weekly boarding and day house situated on the outskirts of the School.

Old Poplars 
Currently Old Poplars is the only House that is exclusively for girls on the campus and accommodates girls from Year 7 to the Lower Sixth.  Old Poplars has benefited from an extensive refurbishment programme which was completed in 2013 and it offers its girl boarders a comfortable 'home from home' character.

Pengelly 
Was constructed in 1975 and named after former headmaster Christian Lanzer's predecessor Kenneth Pengelly.  Pengelly is a newly refurbished building, housing boys from Year 7 to the Lower Sixth. House currently not in use, the building still stands.

Kendon 
Kendon, named after the founder of Bethany, makes up a large proportion of the original building. It was the original Bethany House School, completed in 1866 and named after the School’s founder, J. J. Kendon; originally known as the Old School. It still retains some of its original features although it has been developed extensively over the years and, following further recent refurbishments, is one of the most modern and best-equipped Houses on site.

The Orchard 
This is the newest boarding house and accommodates most of the Sixth Form pupils.  All Upper Sixth and most Lower Sixth pupils have single en-suite rooms.  Day pupils also have study rooms here which can be used for study periods.  The Orchard has generous proportions and facilities include a kitchen, snooker table room, coffee bar, sitting room and lounge.  In 2010 a new block was built adjacent to The Orchard due to increased demand for Sixth Form boarding places.

The Bethanians' Society 

The Bethanians' Society was founded in 1887 for the former pupils of the School, many of whom reside in countries all over the world.
Information on the current events of the school and former pupils are regularly updated on the website.  They also contribute greatly to the annual Old Bethanians' magazine.

Being a member of the Society gives former pupils the opportunity to attend reunions at the School.

See also 
 :Category:People educated at Bethany School, Goudhurst

References

External links 
 Official website
 Official friends network
 Independent Schools Inspectorate
 Independent Schools Council - Schools Information
 Good Schools Guide entry for Bethany School
 Old Bethanians' Society
 Gascoigne, Rodney.  "Schooldays," memoir of an Old Bethanian's time at the school in the 1950s.

Church of England private schools in the Diocese of Rochester
Boarding schools in Kent
Educational institutions established in 1866
Private schools in Kent
1866 establishments in England